The Classic of Mountains and Seas, also known as Shanhai jing, formerly romanized as the Shan-hai Ching, is a Chinese classic text and a compilation of mythic geography and beasts. Early versions of the text may have existed since the 4th century BCE, but the present form was not reached until the early Han dynasty. It is largely a fabulous geographical and cultural account of pre-Qin China as well as a collection of Chinese mythology. The book is divided into eighteen sections; it describes over 550 mountains and 300 channels.

Authorship
The exact author(s) of the book and the time it was written are still undetermined. It was originally thought that mythical figures such as Yu the Great or Boyi wrote the book. However, the consensus among modern Sinologists is that the book was not written at a single time by a single author, but rather by numerous people from the period of the Warring States to the beginning of the Han dynasty.

The first known editor of the Classic was Liu Xiang from the Western Han, who among other things cataloged the Han imperial library. Later, Guo Pu, a scholar from the Western Jin, further annotated the work.

Overview
The book is not a narrative, as the "plot" involves detailed descriptions of locations in the cardinal directions of the Mountains, Regions Beyond Seas, Regions Within Seas, and Wilderness. The descriptions are usually of medicines, animals, and geological features. Many descriptions are very mundane, and an equal number are fanciful or strange. Each chapter follows roughly the same formula, and the whole book is repetitious in this way.

It contains many short myths, and most rarely exceed a paragraph. A famous ancient Chinese myth from this book is that of Yu the Great, who spent years trying to control the deluge. The account of him is in the last chapter, chapter 18, in the 2nd to last paragraph (roughly verse 40). This account is a much more fanciful account than the depiction of him in the Classic of History.

Purpose
Earlier Chinese scholars referred to it as a bestiary, but apparently assumed it was accurate. In fact the information in the book is mythological. It is not known why it was written or how it came to be viewed as an accurate geography book.

English Translations

See also
Chinese mythological geography

 Bai Ze – titular figure of the lost treatise on demonology which has similarities to some of the Shanhaijing.
 Shi Yi Ji (拾遺记) by Wang Jia – a 4th-century work containing "apocryphal" versions of some of the stories in the Classic of Mountains and Seas.

References

Further reading
 
 
  Alt URL
 Fracasso, Riccardo. 1996. "Libro dei monti e dei mari (Shanhai jing): Cosmografia e mitologia nella Cina Antica." Venice: Marsilio. 
 Mathieu, Remi. 1983. "Etude sur la mythologie et l'ethnologie de la Chine Ancienne." Vol I, "Traduction annotee du Shanhai Jing." Vol. II, "Index du Shanhai jing." Paris: College de France, Institut des hautes etudes Chinoises.
 Schiffeler, John Wm. 1978. The Legendary Creatures of the Shan hai ching. Hwa Kang. ASIN B0007AP1OI
 Strassberg, Richard. 2002. A Chinese Bestiary: Strange Creatures from the Guideways Through Mountains and Seas. University of California Press.

External links
 
 Original text (Traditional / Simplified)
 The Original Text (in Simplified Chinese)
 Shanhaijing 山海經, ChinaKnowledge

Chinese classic texts
Chinese literature

Flood myths
Bestiaries